Gerasimovka is a rural locality (a selo) and the administrative center of Gerasimovskoye Rural Settlement, Valuysky District, Belgorod Oblast, Russia. The population was 686 as of 2010. There are 7 streets.

Geography 
Gerasimovka is located 28 km south of Valuyki (the district's administrative centre) by road. Shvedunovka is the nearest rural locality.

References 

Rural localities in Valuysky District